Belisario is a given name. Notable people with the given name include:

Belisario Agulla (born 1988), Argentine rugby union player
Belisario Porras Barahona (1856–1942), Panamanian journalist and politician
Belisario Betancur (1923–2018), Colombian politician
Belisario Corenzio (c. 1558–1643), Greek-Italian painter
Belisario Domínguez (1863–1913), Mexican physician and politician
Belisario Mattera, Italian musician and mandolin virtuoso 
Belisario Villacís (1899-?), Ecuadorian long-distance runner

See also
Belisario (surname)